Ganj Basoda, called Basoda, city and municipality in the Indian state of Madhya Pradesh. Ganj Basoda is one of the eleven tehsils of Vidisha district and is 39 kms from Vidisha.

History 

Earlier there was an oil and flour mill named "Standard Flour and Oil mill" which also got the opportunity to fulfill the need of food in World War II. Owing to unknown reasons it burnt into ashes and because of this reason now the townsmen call it "jali mill". The site of the mill is located near the railway station, opposite the railway goods shed. Today the burnt building stands in the former standard flour and mill area.

Etymology 
Ganj is a common suffix meaning market place or neighbourhood in Hindi, Bengali and Urdu, used in names of neighbourhoods and towns in India, Bangladesh and Pakistan such as Daryaganj. In case of Ganj Basoda, it is a prefix. Actually there are three villages in Vidisha district with word Basoda in their names. To prevent confusion, the word Ganj was conjoined with city's name. Ganj is the nearest village to city situated on the road through which the city was majorly connected with other parts of India.

Geography 
It has an average elevation of 399 metres (1309 feet). Local river Parasari divides the town in two parts. Major river Betwa flows at west end of Ganj Basoda, close to the town. Basoda is generally safe from floods due to its high altitude from the river. Nonetheless, the flood of 1965 is still remembered by townsmen.

Economy 
Ganj Basoda's economy mainly depends on agriculture and stone mines. It has one of the biggest grain mandis of Asia. It has more warehouses than any other city of Madhya Pradesh. The main crops are wheat, soybean, gram, lentils and groundnut. Wheat of Ganj Basoda is famous all over India. Its sandstone is famous in countries like the UK and Italy. Stones mined from Ganj Basoda and nearby places is exported to the international market through Kandla port, Gujarat.

Transport and connectivity 
Ganj Basoda is situated on Delhi-Mumbai and Delhi-Chennai main line. It is situated 94 km from Bhopal, 199 km from Jhansi, 604 km Delhi and 931 km from Mumbai. A new railway line from Basoda to Guna is proposed after which Ganj Basoda will become a junction and the distance from Bhopal, Vidisha and Basoda to Sironj, Guna and Rajasthan will be shortened.

Basoda is well connected through roads with nearby major cities. It is situated 106 km from Bhopal, 306 km from Indore and 106 km from Sagar.

Politics

Educational institutions 
SGS College
LBS College
Krishi Mahavidyalaya (JNKVV)
Rajiv Gandhi College
Subhadra Sharma Girls College
Media Computer College
Shahid Chandrashekhar Azad College
Modal Public School
Bharat Mata Convent Senior Secondary School
Bharat Vidhya Mandir Hr.
Dolphin – The School of Wisdom
International Public School
Kendriya Vidyalaya
Navankur Vidyapeeth Higher Secondary School
Ratan Bai Jain Hr. Sec. School
Scholars' Public School
Spandan Academy
St Joseph School
TT Jain Hr. Sec. School
Vrindavan Public School
Sarasvati Shishu Mandir

Tourist attractions 
One of the most important attractions near Ganj Basoda is Udayeshwar Nilkantheshwar Temple, a Shiva temple at Udaipur (Madhya Pradesh).

Two inscriptions of Hijri 737 and 739 are mentioned in the time of Muhammad Tughlaq and in the Hijri 856 during the reign of Islam Shah Suri, the mosque was constructed and in the inscription of Hijri 894, the mosque was built during the time of Muhammad Shah Khaliji of Mandu. The outer walls of the main Nilkantheshwar Temple have been broken during the time of the rulers of the architectural Muslim rule of UtraKin Devi Deities, whose remains are currently available in the Temple Pragnan.

The main temple has been built in the middle and it has three entrances. Shivalinga is installed in the sanctum in which only rays of sun rising on the day of Shivratri falls. In the sanctum sanctorum of the main temple, the shape of the shivaling is about 8 feet, which is covered with bronze which is only thrown on Shivratri day. Presently Lord Shiva is worshiped on the temple Archana. The construction of Shivling is similar to the Shivlinga located in the Bhojpur Shiva temple situated near Bhopal.

The idol of various gods and goddesses on the outer wall of the temple has been engraved on stone, most of the idol is equipped with various forms of Lord Shiva. In the important sculpture craft, there is a statue of Mahatmasur Mardini, Kartikeya, etc. in the dance form Natraj Murthy of Lord Shiva. And in addition, the woman displays beauty.

Another great ancient Shiva Temple is located at Gamakar Village, about 10 km from Basoda Town. The temple is of Natural origin cave temple. Hundreds of pilgrims visit this temple daily. A large fair is organised every year at Maha Shivratri. Thousands of people visit this place on this day. In village Gamakar, about 500 years old Garhis (small forts where Jagirdars lived) are present which are residents for Raghuwanshi community. The village is well connected with the Basoda Town by road.

Pathari located at a road distance of 30 km from Basoda is an ancient site of historical importance for believers of Jainism and Buddhism. Temples (Jain 24 Thirtankars, Gadrmal temple, BHIM Gaja approximately 50 ft height of single stone piece) of 10th–11th century are situated here at Pathari. 18 km from Basoda near village Udaipur is another village Muradpur, where one can see unique statue of Varah (Lord Vishnu avatar) only of its kind in the world.
To visit Udaipur, Muradpur and Pathari (badoh), one can follow motorable road from Basoda, following given route—Ganj Basoda (0 km)- Bareth (10 km)- Udaipur (16 km)-Pathari (30 km. For Muradpur (3 km from Udaipur on branch route).
You may visit the modern temple of Goddess Sheetala Mata in the heart of Basoda.

† Not to be confused with a city in Indian state of Rajasthan with similar name, see Udaipur

References 

Cities and towns in Vidisha district